Modell Bianka is an East German film. It was released in 1951.

External links
 

1951 films
East German films
1950s German-language films
German black-and-white films
1950s German films